Henry Tzu-Yow Yang (born November 29, 1940) is a Chinese American mechanical engineer, university administrator, and the fifth and current chancellor of the University of California, Santa Barbara, a post he has held since 1994.

Early life and education 
Yang was born in Chongqing, China, on November 29, 1940. In 1949, his family moved from Mainland China to Taiwan. 

Yang received a Bachelor of Science with a major in civil engineering from National Taiwan University in 1962, a Master of Science in structural engineering from West Virginia University in 1965, and a Doctor of Philosophy in civil engineering from Cornell University in 1968.

Career

At Purdue University 
Regarded as an expert in aerospace structures, structural dynamics, transonic aeroelasticity, wind and earthquake structural engineering, intelligent manufacturing systems, and finite elements, Yang was on the staff of Purdue University for 25 years.  He first joined the faculty as an assistant professor in 1969, before being elevated to the head of the Purdue University School of Aeronautics and Astronautics which he served for five years from 1980 to 1984.  Yang was named the dean of the Purdue University College of Engineering on July 1, 1984, a role he held for 10 years until his departure to UC Santa Barbara.

Yang is an eight-time winner of the Elmer F. Bruhn Award, which honors outstanding teachers at the Purdue University School of Aeronautics and Astronautics.  He was named as the university's Neil A. Armstrong Distinguished Professor of Aeronautics and Astronautics, a title bestowed on him from 1988 through 1994.

At UC Santa Barbara 
After a seven-month search process by the University of California, Santa Barbara of over 150 applicants, Yang was named as the school's fifth chancellor in March 1994.  He began his post on June 23, 1994.

He has authored or co-authored 170 articles for scientific journals, as well as a widely used textbook on finite element structural analysis. He has guided 54 Ph.D. and 20 M.S. recipients. In addition to his role as chancellor, he is also a professor of mechanical engineering at UC Santa Barbara, and continues to teach an undergraduate engineering course each year. He is currently supervising three Ph.D. students with support from National Science Foundation grants. He is also a co-principal investigator for the Mathematics, Engineering, Science Achievement (MESA) program of the University of California.

Boards and committees 
Yang has served on scientific advisory boards for the Department of Defense, U.S. Air Force, U.S. Navy, NASA, and the National Academy of Engineering. He is a past chair of the Association of Pacific Rim Universities (2010–2014) and the Association of American Universities (2009–2010).

Yang currently serves on the President's Committee for the National Medal of Science, being appointed originally by George W. Bush in 2009 and again by Barack Obama in 2011.  He was named as chairman of the board for the Thirty Meter Telescope project in 2007 and still holds the position.  He also currently serves on the board of directors of The Kavli Foundation.

Awards and honors 
Yang holds honorary doctorates from Purdue University (1996), Hong Kong University of Science and Technology (2002), National Taiwan University (presumably 2004), City University of Hong Kong (2005), Chinese University of Hong Kong (2008), West Virginia University (2011), and Hong Kong Polytechnic University (2011).

He is the 1998 recipient of the Benjamin Garver Lamme Award from the American Society for Engineering Education and the 2008 recipient of the Structures, Structural Dynamics, & Materials Award from the American Institute of Aeronautics and Astronautics.

Yang was elected as a member of the National Academy of Engineering in 1991.

References

External links 

 UCSB Chancellor biography
 UCSB Department of Mechanical Engineering biography
 Kavli Foundation biography
 APRU biography
 CCST biography

American aerospace engineers
Cornell University College of Engineering alumni
Engineering educators
Living people
American mechanical engineers
National Taiwan University alumni
Purdue University faculty
American structural engineers
Taiwanese emigrants to the United States
University of California, Santa Barbara faculty
Chancellors of the University of California, Santa Barbara
West Virginia University alumni
Members of Committee of 100
People from Santa Barbara, California
1940 births
American academics of Chinese descent
Taiwanese people from Chongqing
Chinese Civil War refugees
Foreign members of the Chinese Academy of Engineering